KNEL (1490 AM) is a radio station licensed to Brady, Texas.  The station broadcasts an Oldies format and is owned by Farris Broadcasting, Inc.

References

External links
KNEL's official website

Oldies radio stations in the United States
NEL